Lessons of the Masters is a 2004 book by George Steiner. It is part history, part analysis of the mentor-protégé relationship. From Socrates and Jesus to Husserl, Heidegger and Arendt, not leaving out Plotinus, Augustine, Shakespeare, Dante, Marlowe, Kepler, Wittgenstein, Nadia Boulanger and Simone Weil, Steiner shows how much is at stake in the passing on of wisdom and the risks involved.

The book is based on Steiner's Norton lectures.

2004 non-fiction books
Alternative education
Books by George Steiner
English-language books
Harvard University Press books